Haemaphlebiella is a genus of moths in the family Erebidae. The genus was described by R. J. Collins in 1962. Members of this genus are found in the northern part of South America.

Species 
 Haemaphlebiella formona (Schaus, 1905)
 Haemaphlebiella strigata (E. D. Jones, 1914)
 Haemaphlebiella venata (Rothschild, 1909)

References

External links 

Phaegopterina
Moth genera